Andrew Mason (born 1981) is an American businessman, founder and former CEO of Groupon.

Andrew Mason may also refer to:

 Andrew Mason (cricketer, born 1943), English cricketer
 Andrew Mason (cricketer, born 1979), English cricketer
 Andrew Mason (rugby league) (born 1962), English rugby union and rugby league footballer
 Andy Mason (born 1974), English footballer
 Andrew Stephen Mason; see Mason family

See also
 Harold Andrew Mason (1911–1993), English university lecturer